Aleks is a given name and alternative form of Alec or Alex. Notable people with the name include:

 Aleks Buda (1910-1993), Albanian historian
 Aleks Çaçi (1916-1989), Albanian author
 Aleks Danko (born 1950), Australian sculptor
 Aleks Tarn (born 1955), Russian journalist and writer
 Aleks Paunovic (born 1969), Canadian actor
 Aleks Syntek (born 1969), Mexican singer and songwriter
 Aleks Krotoski (born 1974), American journalist and broadcaster
 Aleks Marić (born 1984), Australian basketball player
 Aleks Vrteski (born 1988), Macedonian football goalkeeper
 Aleks Vanderpool-Wallace (born 1988), Bahamian football midfielder
 Aleks (footballer) (born 1991), Brazilian football goalkeeper
 Aleks Pihler (born 1994), Slovenian footballer
 Aleks Josh (born 1995), English singer and songwriter
 Aleks Berkolds (born 1996), American soccer defender
 Aleks Borimirov (born 1998), Bulgarian football winger
 Aleks Matsukatov (born 1999), Russian football midfielder
 Aleks Ławniczak (born 1999), Polish football defender
 Aleks Lukanov (born 2002), Bulgarian football midfielder
 Aleks Sierz, British theatre critic
 Aleks Pluskowski, English archeologist

See also
 
Aleks (disambiguation)
Alex, given name
Alec, given name
Alek, given name
Aleksa (given name)